Freedom of religion in South Korea is provided for in the South Korean constitution. The South Korean government has generally respected this right in practice, although it provides no exemption or alternative civilian service for those who have a religious objection to serve in the armed forces.

Laws guaranteeing the right to freedom of religion

Constitutional laws 
Freedom of religion for all citizens and the separation of the state and religious organizations is guaranteed by the Constitution of the Republic of Korea, article 20. 

(1) All citizens shall enjoy the freedom of religion. 

(2) No state religion shall be recognized, and religion and state shall be separated. 

Moreover, any discrimination based on a citizen's religious belief is strictly forbidden by Article 11 :

(1) All citizens shall be equal before the law, and there shall be no discrimination in political, economic, social, or cultural life on account of sex, religion, or social status.

International laws and treaties

International Covenant on Civil and Political Rights (ICCPR) 
The Republic of Korea is a member party to the UN multilateral treaty International Covenant on Civil and Political Rights (ICCPR) which provides that every individual has the right and freedom to adopt a religion or belief of his/ her choice and to manifest his/ her religion or belief either individually or in community with others, either in public or private (article 18), every individual has the right to be free from discrimination based on religious belief (Article 2) and this right is irrevocable even in conditions of emergency which threatens the life of the nation (Article 4). The government has the duty to guarantee all individuals equal and effective protection against religious discrimination (Article 26).  

Individuals have also the freedom to profess non-theistic and atheistic beliefs as well as the right not to profess any religion or belief. The terms belief and religion are to be broadly construed. (UN Human Rights Committee, General comment 22, 30 July 1993)

Relationship between religious organizations and the state

Legal status of religious organizations 
There is neither an official religion nor state atheism in the Republic of Korea. Also, unlike in many other countries, the government does not compile any list of recognized religions. Thus, there cannot be said that any religious organization is more legitimate than other in Korea, from a legal point of view. All religious organizations are equal before the law, regardless of the number of members, number of years since founding or their beliefs. There is in fact no specific law that regulates religious activities. Religious groups manage their assets through two types of legal personality: civil associations (사단) or foundations (재단).  

In 2011 there were 382 civil associations and 322 foundations related to various religious organizations.

Independent research

Pew research center's  Government Restrictions Index 
According to Pew research Center's  Government Restrictions Index which measures the overall level of restrictions that the government places on religious organizations using an aggregate score of 20 indicators and then classifies countries in four categories  (Low - the best category, Medium, High and Very High). In the 2009 respectively 2011 indexes South Korea was placed in the category Low and in the 2015 index the country was placed in the category Moderate.

Religious demography

According to a 2005 government survey, when the population stood at 47,041,000, the numbers of adherents of the predominant religions were: Buddhism, 10,726,000; Protestantism, 8,616,000; Roman Catholicism, 5,146,000; Confucianism, 105,000; Won Buddhism, 130,000; and other religions, 247,000. A total of 22,071,000 citizens did not practice any religion. The percentage of the population adhering to each religious tradition has remained approximately the same in recent years.

There are no official figures on the membership of other religious groups such as Jehovah's Witnesses, The Church of Jesus Christ of Latter-day Saints (Mormons), Seventh-day Adventist Church, Daesun Jinrihoe, and Islam.

Buddhism has 27 orders within the country. The Catholic Church has 16 dioceses. Within the major Protestant traditions there are a total of 121 denominations, approximately 90 percent of which are separate Presbyterian groups. The Christian Council of Korea (CCK) reported that there are an estimated 75 Protestant denominations with at least 100 congregations nationwide, including Methodist, Lutheran, Baptist, Presbyterian, Anglican, and the Korean Gospel Church Assembly.

According to Gallup Korea's 2004 survey on the state of religion in the country, 36 percent of those who practiced a faith reported that they attended religious services or rituals at a church or temple more than once a week, 10.6 percent attended two to three times per month, 20.6 percent attended once or twice a year, and 4.9 percent did not attend services. Of those who attended religious services more than once a week, Protestants had the highest attendance rate at 71 percent, Catholics 42.9 percent, and Buddhists 3.5 percent.

Foreign-based missionary groups operate freely. In 2006 the country sent more than 16,000 missionaries abroad, making it the world's second largest source of Christian missionaries after the United States.

Status of religious freedom

Legal and policy framework

There is no state religion in South Korea.  There are no government-established requirements for religious recognition. The Traditional Temples Preservation Law protects cultural properties including Buddhist temples, which receive some subsidies from the government for their preservation and upkeep. Buddha's Birthday and Christmas are the only national holidays that are religious in nature.

The government does not permit religious instruction in public schools. Private schools are free to conduct religious activities.

The 'Religious Affairs Bureau' of the Ministry of Culture and Tourism in South Korea takes the lead in organizing groups such as the Korean Religious Council and the Council for Peaceful Religions to promote interfaith dialogue and understanding. The Bureau also is responsible for planning regular events such as the Religion and Art Festival, the Seminar for Religious Leaders, and the Symposium for Religious Newspapers and Journalists.

Restrictions on religious freedom

The South Korean government provides no exemption or alternative civilian service for those who have a religious objection to service in the armed forces. According to the National Assembly's Defense Committee, in 2006 Jehovah's Witnesses accounted for all of the 781 men who rejected military service. Of those 781, 548 were given prison sentences of at least 18 months, 1 was given a prison sentence of more than 2 years, 225 are awaiting trial, and 7 were released without charge. Those sentenced were allowed to conduct their own religious services in prison. In 2005 the National Human Rights Commission recommended that South Korea recognize an individual's right, based on religious conviction, to refuse compulsory military service, and called for an alternative form of service. In April 2006 the South Korean Ministry of National Defense established a 17-member committee, made up of scholars, lawyers, journalists, religious leaders, civic activists, and military officials, to study ways to introduce and establish the standards for such alternative service. From April 2006 to March 2007, the committee met 8 times to discuss how to introduce such a system. On June 6, 2007, the committee concluded that it was too early to acknowledge those who have religious objections to service in the military and to introduce an alternative service system.

Other than the conscientious objectors mentioned above, there were no other official reports of religious prisoners or detainees in the country.

Hye-min Kim, Lak-hoon Cho, and Hyeong-geun Kim, were recently set free from the appeal court. Their case was based on conscientious objection to military service. The unexpected "not guilty" decision of the Gwangju Appellate Court demonstrates the change in attitude among the legal profession. Judges are increasingly recognising conscientious objection is a valid justification for refusing military service.
At this current time South Korea's Constitutional Court has yet to come to a decision on the right to freedom of conscience in relation to military service.

Societal abuses and discrimination

There were no reports of societal abuses or discrimination based on religious belief or practice, and prominent societal leaders took positive steps to promote religious freedom.

Religious leaders regularly met both privately and under government auspices to promote mutual understanding and tolerance. These meetings were given wide and favorable coverage by the media. For example, the Korean Council of Religious Leaders holds an annual event, the ROK Religious Culture Festival, which aims to promote reconciliation and mutual understanding among religious groups. The 2006 festival, at Seoul City Hall Plaza, was attended by the Jogye Order of Korean Buddhism, Christian Churches of Korea, Won Buddhism, the Korea Religious Council, and the Catholic Church, among other groups.

See also

Religion in South Korea
Human rights in South Korea

References

 Best court decision of the year. 2017.

South Korea
Human rights in South Korea
Religion in South Korea